Åsa Ingrid Gunilla Westlund (born 19 May 1976 in Anderstorp, Jönköping County, Småland, Sweden) is a Swedish politician who has been Member of the Riksdag since 2014, representing Stockholm County. In the Riksdag, she is chairman of the Committee on Finance since 2020.

She was previously a Member of the European Parliament for the Swedish Social Democratic Party, part of the Party of European Socialists, from 2004 to 2014.

References

External links

Åsa Westlund at the Social Democratic Party 

1976 births
Living people
People from Gislaved Municipality
Swedish bloggers
Swedish Social Democratic Party MEPs
MEPs for Sweden 2004–2009
MEPs for Sweden 2009–2014
21st-century women MEPs for Sweden
Swedish women bloggers
Members of the Riksdag 2014–2018
Members of the Riksdag 2018–2022
Members of the Riksdag 2022–2026
Women members of the Riksdag
Members of the Riksdag from the Social Democrats
21st-century Swedish women politicians